was a travelogue and information quiz show that was broadcast from October 6, 1981, until March 26, 1996 on Fuji TV.

Format
The game would be played by eight celebrity contestants in teams of two. After an initial quiz, the teams would be ranked in order 1 to 4. Subsequent questions would be posed to the lowest team first; if they could not answer it, the next higher ranking team would have a shot. Correct answers enabled a team to rise in rank, and cause the next higher rank team to fall in rank. The team that finished in the number 1 position would win the game. Questions were posed by reporters in video-taped reports from exotic locations throughout the world, with the questions being about that location. The location reports could be events in themselves, with some from places like the Arctic, and were central to the show's success.

An English version was produced in 1991 with  
Nicholas Parsons	Nicholas Parsons	...	Himself
Julian Clary	Julian Clary	...	Himself
Dexter Fletcher	Dexter Fletcher	...	Himself
Masumi Okada	Masumi Okada	...	Himself
Cleo Rocos	Cleo Rocos	...	Herself
Michaela Strachan	Michaela Strachan	...	Herself
Andrew Eborn  Andrew Eborn ( Magic Trump Man)  ..... Himself

Reception
Over a total of 723 episodes, the series averaged 21.4% in audience ratings. It garnered its top rating of 36.4% on 27 December 1983.

Video game
A Super Famicom game based on the show was released in 1994 by Tomy. The cover art features Kinya Aikawa and Eriko Kusuda.

See also
Kakku

References

External links
 Naruhodo: The World! at UKGameshows.com
 
 

1980s Japanese television series
1990s Japanese television series
1981 Japanese television series debuts
1996 Japanese television series endings
Fuji TV original programming
Japanese game shows
Japanese travel television series